These are the official results of the Women's 400 metres event at the 1987 IAAF World Championships in Rome, Italy. There were a total number of 41 participating athletes, with six qualifying heats and the final held on 31 August 1987.

Results

Final
Monday, 31 August 1987

Semifinals
Sunday, 30 August 1987

Heats
Saturday, 29 August 1987

References
 Results

 
400 metres at the World Athletics Championships
1987 in women's athletics